Morteza Atashzamzam is an Iranian film director and producer who was born in 1977 in Isfahan, Iran.

Career
Morteza Atashzamzam graduated from university in Computer Sciences. Since 2002, he has directed and produced more than forty independent films, documentaries, and television series. He was the director of Bam Film Festival (2008 & 2010). The 2016 film Melancholy was his first feature film as a director.

Filmography

Documentary

Film

Series

Others

References

External links
 

Living people
Iranian film producers
Iranian television directors
Iranian film directors
1977 births
People from Isfahan